Akai Buranko (赤いブランコ ) (Red Swing) is the 16th single released by Japanese pop duo Puffy AmiYumi. "Red Swing" was the opening track for Nice. There is an English version titled "Planet Tokyo".

Sophie Bennett and Kia Luby covered "Planet Tokyo" on their CDs Spin and Planet Tokyo.

Tracks
 赤いブランコ  (Akai Buranko)
 Planet Tokyo 
 アジアの純真 ～English Version～
 Red Swing

External links
Lyrics
Lyrics (English)

Puffy AmiYumi songs
2002 songs